SS Maasdam was a Dutch steam merchant and was the third of five with this name in the Holland America Line. She was originally launched 21 October 1920, with a length of 466, beam of 58 feet and a tonnage of 8,812 GRT. Constructed at Rotterdam, she was originally designed as a combination cargo and passenger vessel. She had a crew of eighty-nine and originally showed two funnels, but only one was functioning. The ship laid up in 1933 and overhauled the next year with the dummy funnel and some passenger cabins removed, and crew size to forty-eight.

On 9 May 1940 she was in port in Liverpool England, awaiting return to the Netherlands when the crew was warned not to return to their home country. The next day the German army invaded the Low Countries. The ship and crew were immediately militarized and Maasdam was chartered to the Ministry of War Transport in London. Maasdam left New York for Halifax on 11 June 1941 with a crew of forty-eight, plus thirty-two passengers, including eleven US Marine Corps personnel and seventeen American Red Cross volunteer nurses. The marines were destined for duty at the US Embassy in London and the nurses were scheduled to serve at the Harvard Hospital. Halifax was a common port from which eastbound convoys formed. Maasdam arrived the evening of 13 June 1941. Assigned to Convoy HX 133, she left 16 June amidst incredibly dense fog that lasted four days, causing several ship collisions.

On 26 June 1941, at 2345 hours GMT U-564 fired multiple torpedoes in rapid succession. The first torpedo struck Maasdam's port side at the rear of cargo hold no. 2. Immediately following two other ships next to Maasdam were also hit, Malaya II a British freighter loaded with TNT and Norwegian tanker Kongsgaard. She sank in the Atlantic Ocean off Greenland. Seventy-eight of the Eighty people on board survived and were rescued by Norwegian ship Havprins and former Danish ship Randa. The two people lost at sea were nurses Maxine Loomis and Ruth Bradley. Ruth traveled to England to work in London at a hospital as a house mother to Red Cross nurses. She was the ex-wife of Colonel Henry S. Breckinridge (Secretary of War under Harry S. Truman), mother of Elizabeth Breckinridge and mother-in-law of John Stephens Graham. Ruth Breckinridge traveled via the SS Maasdam for England where she was to work in London at a hospital as a house mother to Red Cross nurses.

Prior to being sunk in 1941, Maasdam was in several convoys starting on May 26, 1940 with Convoy FN.181 between Southend and Methil.  It was part of other convoys between Halifax and Liverpool, Tyne and Southend and from Liverpool. SS Maasdam collided with the British cargo ship Anthea off the coast of Canada and SS Anthea sank.

References

Further reading
 

1920 ships
Ships built at Maatschappij voor scheeps- en werktuigbouw Fijenoord, Rotterdam
Cargo liners
Steamships of the Netherlands
Ships of the Holland America Line
World War II merchant ships of the Netherlands
Maritime incidents in June 1941
Ships sunk by German submarines in World War II
World War II shipwrecks in the Atlantic Ocean